DYDL (103.9 FM), broadcasting as 103.9 Real Radio, is a radio station owned and operated by PEC Broadcasting Corporation. The station's studio and transmitter facilities are located in Carmen, Bohol.

References

Radio stations in Bohol